Greg Ladanyi (July 6, 1952 – September 29, 2009) was an American record producer and recording engineer of Hungarian descent, known for his work with many musicians, including Jackson Browne, Warren Zevon, The Church, Caifanes,  Anna Vissi, Toto, Fleetwood Mac, Don Henley, and Jeff Healey.

Biography
Ladanyi began his career by working on Hasten Down the Wind under the tutelage of engineer/producer Val Garay.

Around 1980 Ladanyi expanded from just engineering into production as well. He recounted, "Part of the way I came up into coproducing was by elevating engineering to a point where it has an awful lot to do with the production of the record. That comes from a lot of dialogue with an artist and really taking some responsibility for the way a record comes out, as opposed to just sitting there and doing what an artist or producer needs done." Ladanyi co-produced the Behind the Mask album with Fleetwood Mac. He also co-produced, engineered, and mixed Don Henley's first two solo albums I Can't Stand Still and Building the Perfect Beast. He won a Grammy Award in 1983 in the Best Engineered Recording - Non-Classical category for Toto IV by Toto.

He married Laura  Grayson-Ladanyi in 1984 and divorced in 1992. He was a collaborator and co-founder of "The Complex Studios"  with George Massenburg, on Corinth Ave in WLA 1987 till 1991. He co-produced Fleetwood Mac's Greatest Hits (WB), Jeff Healey's "See the Light" (Arista), The Church's "Under the Milky Way" with Waddy Wachtel (Arista), various Japanese artists, Clannad (RCA/BMG), Caifanes, Jaguares, REO Speedwagon (Sony), and Engenheiros do Hawaii (BMG Brazil). He traveled and worked internationally throughout the world till 1998, and managed artists under the name of Ladanyi Entertainment.

In 2007, he partnered with Starr Andreeff and Mike Renault to form Maple Jam Music Group. His most recent work involved producing Ligion's new album, External Affairs. He was also the main producer on Anna Vissi's album, Apagorevmeno, which was released on December 9, 2008, in Greece and Cyprus.

Ladanyi is mentioned in the lyrics for the song "Cocaine" on Jackson Browne's 1977 album Running on Empty.

Ladanyi died on September 29, 2009, after falling 13 feet just 15 minutes before Vissi's performance at Nicosia's GSP Stadium, suffering a fractured skull.

Partial discography

Producer/co-producer

 Bad Luck Streak in Dancing School (1980) - Warren Zevon
 Hold Out (1980) - Jackson Browne
 Stand in the Fire (1980) - Warren Zevon
 I Can't Stand Still (1982) - Don Henley
 The Envoy (1982) - Warren Zevon
 Lawyers in Love (1983) - Jackson Browne
 Building the Perfect Beast (1984) - Don Henley
 A Quiet Normal Life: The Best of Warren Zevon (1986) - Warren Zevon
 After Dark (1987) - Cruzados
 Sirius (1987) - Clannad
 In the Spirit of Things (1988) - Kansas
 See the Light (1988) - The Jeff Healey Band
 Starfish (1988) - The Church
 Stealin Horses (1988) - Stealin Horses
 The End of the Innocence (1989) - Don Henley
 Behind the Mask (1990) - Fleetwood Mac
  Gypsy Moon (album) (1991) - Troy Newman
  Extraordinary Life (1992) - The Believers 
 Kingdom of Desire (1992) - Toto
 El nervio del volcán (1994) - Caifanes
  It's Like This (album) (1995) - Troy Newman
 "Simples de Coração" (1995) - Engenheiros do Hawaii
 Actual Miles: Henley's Greatest Hits (1995) - Don Henley
  Velvet Hammer (Demos) (1996) - Troy Newman
 Los de Abajo (1998) - Los de Abajo
 Bajo el Azul de Tu Misterio (1999) - Jaguares
 Apagorevmeno (2008) - Anna Vissi

Engineer only
 Running on Empty  (1977) (engineer only) -  Jackson Browne

Mixer
 White Shadows (1977) Tim Moore
 Toto IV (1982) - Toto
 Isolation (1984) - Toto
 Victory (1984) (track "Wait") - The Jacksons

References

External links
Video interview with Greg Ladanyi
Profile on StudioExpresso.com

Maple Jam Music Group Official Website

1952 births
2009 deaths
Accidental deaths from falls
Record producers from Hawaii
Grammy Award winners
People from Elkhart, Indiana
Accidental deaths in Cyprus
Record producers from Indiana
American people of Hungarian descent